Henrique Vermudt (born 25 February 1999) is a Brazilian professional footballer who plays as a defender for Botafogo.

References

External links

1999 births
Living people
Brazilian footballers
Association football defenders
Coritiba Foot Ball Club players
Campeonato Brasileiro Série A players
Brazilian people of German descent
People from Cascavel
Sportspeople from Paraná (state)
Botafogo de Futebol e Regatas players